Chicken and chips is a combination of foods predominantly consumed in the United Kingdom, The Commonwealth, and United States. It consists of a piece of fried, roasted, or barbecued chicken and chips, or French fries as they are known elsewhere. The consumption of chicken and chips is a popular food choice based on its value for money. In some cities, such as London, on most high streets there are at least one or two chicken and chip shops, amongst kebab, pizza, Chinese, and Indian take-away shops. Other names for chicken and chips include: Chicken fingers, chicken tenders, chicken nuggets and fries.   

A serving of chicken and chips is usually packaged in a small cardboard box lined with a piece of greaseproof paper. A sachet of salt, a packet of ketchup or other sauces, and sometimes pepper, is sometimes served with the food. 

In 2012, chicken and chips was added to the UK consumer basket, used for calculating inflation.

See also
 Chicken fingers
 Fish and chips

References

British cuisine
American cuisine
Food combinations
Fast food